Abdul Rashid (born 25 April 1928) is a Pakistani long-distance runner. He competed in the marathon at the 1956 Summer Olympics.

References

External links
 

1928 births
Possibly living people
Athletes (track and field) at the 1952 Summer Olympics
Athletes (track and field) at the 1956 Summer Olympics
Pakistani male long-distance runners
Pakistani male marathon runners
Olympic athletes of Pakistan
Place of birth missing (living people)